Vespasian (9–79) was the emperor of Rome from 69 to 79.

Vespasian or Vespasien is also the name of:

 Vespasien Gribaldi, archbishop of Vienne (1569–1575) - see Roman Catholic Archdiocese of Vienne
 Vespasian Pella (1897–1960), Romanian legal expert and ambassador to Switzerland during World War II
 Vespasien Robin (1579–1662), son of Jean Robin (botanist), and like his father, botanist to the King of France 
 Vespasian Warner (1842–1925), US representative from Illinois
 José Vespasien (born 1976), French basketball player

See also
 Stele of Vespasian, a stele found in an ancient Georgian capital
 Cotton Vespasian manuscripts, part of the Cotton library, named for the emperor's bust above the original bookcase; see List of manuscripts in the Cotton library#Vespasian
 Vespasian Psalter, an 8th century manuscript in the Cotton collection
 Vespasiano, a Brazilian municipality
 Vespasiano (given name), a list of people
 Wespazjan Kochowski (born 1633), Polish writer
 Pissoir, also called in French a vespasienne, a public urinal

Latin masculine given names
Romanian masculine given names